The 1958 Australian federal election was held in Australia on 22 November 1958. All 122 seats in the House of Representatives and 32 of the 60 seats in the Senate were up for election. The incumbent Liberal–Country coalition led by Prime Minister Robert Menzies defeated the opposition Labor Party, led by H. V. Evatt.

Issues
In spite of a major global downturn in early 1958, the Coalition was returned to power and there was an even swing against the Labor Party. This was due largely to support for the breakaway Democratic Labor Party. This was the first Australian election campaign to be fought using television as a medium for communicating with voters. Menzies was interviewed on television, while opposition figures H. V. Evatt and Arthur Calwell took part in debates with ministers Harold Holt and William McMahon. Somewhat surprisingly Menzies emerged as a confident and effective television performer. This may have contributed to the better than expected result for the government.

Results

House of Representatives

Senate

Notes
 The Democratic Labor Party was the renamed "Anti-Communist Labor Party" from the 1955 election.
 "Other" includes 4,459 votes for "Loyalist" candidates, 4,337 for "True Democrat" candidates, and 3,715 for "Republican" candidates.

Seats changing hands

 Members listed in italics did not contest their seat at this election.

See also
 Candidates of the Australian federal election, 1958
 Members of the Australian House of Representatives, 1958–1961
 Members of the Australian Senate, 1959–1962

References
 University of WA  election results in Australia since 1890
 AEC 2PP vote
 Prior to 1984 the AEC did not undertake a full distribution of preferences for statistical purposes. The stored ballot papers for the 1983 election were put through this process prior to their destruction. Therefore, the figures from 1983 onwards show the actual result based on full distribution of preferences.

Federal elections in Australia
1958 elections in Australia
November 1958 events in Australia